Jack Kenneth Manuel (born 13 February 1991) is an English cricketer. Manuel is a left-handed batsman who bowls right-arm off break. He was born in Sutton Coldfield, Warwickshire and educated at Wilnecote High School in Tamworth.

Manuel made his debut in county cricket for Staffordshire in the 2009 MCCA Knockout Trophy against Suffolk. He made six appearances in the competition in 2009, with three further appearances in 2010. He made his debut for England Under-19s in 2009, playing Youth Test, One Day International and Twenty20 International matches in 2009 and 2010.

The 2010 season saw him make his debut for Worcestershire in a Twenty20 match in the Friends Provident t20 against Northamptonshire. That same season also saw him make his List A debut against Sussex in the Clydesdale Bank 40. The following season he made his first-class debut against Somerset in the 2011 County Championship. In his only first-class appearance to date, he scored 5 runs in Worcestershire's first-innings of the match, before being dismissed by Alfonso Thomas, while in their second-innings he was dismissed for a duck by Murali Kartik. To date he has played seven List A matches and thirteen Twenty20 matches.

References

External links
Jack Manuel at ESPNcricinfo
Jack Manuel at CricketArchive

1991 births
Living people
Cricketers from Sutton Coldfield
English cricketers
Staffordshire cricketers
Worcestershire cricketers